The 1961 Pacific Tigers football team represented the College of the Pacific during the 1961 NCAA College Division football season.

Pacific competed as an independent in 1961. They played home games in Pacific Memorial Stadium in Stockton, California. In their first season under head coach John Rohde, the Tigers finished with a record of five wins and four losses (5–4). For the season they outscored their opponents 200–187.

Schedule

Team players in the NFL
No College of the Pacific players were selected in the 1962 NFL Draft.

The following finished their college career at Pacific, were not drafted, but played in the NFL starting with the 1962 season.

Notes

References

Pacific
Pacific Tigers football seasons
Pacific Tigers football